Bannerstones are artifacts usually found in the Eastern United States that are characterized by a centered hole in a symmetrically shaped carved or ground stone. The holes are typically " to " in diameter and extend through a raised portion centered in the stone. They usually are bored all the way through but some have been found with holes that extend only part of the way through. Many are made from banded slate or other colored hard stone. They often have a geometric "wing nut" or "butterfly" shape but are not limited to these. More than just functional artifacts, bannerstones are a form of art that appear in varying shapes, designs, and colors, symbolizing their ceremonial and spiritual importance.

Debates over function
Archaeologists have debated over the use of bannerstones. Some have suggested that they are atlatl weights or ceremonial pieces. Others believe that they may be for drilling, cordage making, or fire making. Robert S. Berg's theory proposed that they are part of a kit of tools used to make and repair atlatl darts. Berg's theory has met with a lot of skepticism and resistance because of the previous works of William S. Webb, who proposed that the bannerstone was actually part of an atlatl. Webb cited in situ evidence which consisted mainly of bannerstones found in line with atlatl handles and hooks in graves that archaeologists dug up during the construction of the Tennessee Valley Authority's massive water control system in the southeast during the early part of the 20th century. It seems that "their primary value lay in their symbolic and aesthetic worth rather than in their tool-like efficiency"  because of the manner in which they were created and later found in archaeological sites.

The ceremonial importance of bannerstones is related to "the psychological uncertainties and physical dangers of daily life among early hunters and gatherers". These peoples appealed to the powers of the stone, their creators or deities, and the natural entities around them for protection and survival in the harsh life of the Archaic Period. Being killed in the hunt is one danger that they would have been trying to protect themselves from, while giving thanks and recognizing the powers guiding their spears thrown from the atlatls would help ensure their success in the hunt. As stated in Hero, Hawk, and Open Hand: American Indian Art of the Ancient Midwest and South, "[bannerstones'] craftsmanship and materials suggest that they also served as emblems of prestige and status conferred upon hunters coming of age, and as supernatural talismans for increasing the spear-throwers efficacy. They may also have served as emblems of clans or other social units." This shows the bannerstone going beyond simple function in the hunt to complex symbolic function in various aspects of society.

History and context
Bannerstones, as part of a larger picture, indicate that the societies in which they were a part had greater social organization than those in the past. They also indicate a greater interdependence among tribes of various regions. Brian M. Fagan states that, "the production of elaborate and labor-intensive bannerstones (atlatl weights) and stone vessels makes little sense at a local level, but when produced as objects used in broad exchange networks tied to cooperative alliances, such artifacts have considerable value." This is because, as he further states, "many of the important technological innovations of the Archaic resulted from just such successful alliances which made life more secure in an unpredictable environment of patchy food resources". Therefore, bannerstones can be seen as indicators of ties between societies in the form of trade, whether it is for the stone that the bannerstone is made out of, the region where the finished bannerstone is found, or the way that it is designed. "Innovations" speak of new ideas entering already existing societies and merging with pre-existing beliefs, resulting in artifacts and art forms such as bannerstones.

Fagan also states, that "from the Mid Archaic onward, people invested more labor in fashioning socially valued artifacts and ornaments like finely ground 'bannerstones'" to be used in the networks of trade and formation of "alliances." Bannerstones were created for more than just strict physical survival; they were created for spiritual survival and wellbeing as a part of a cosmological system of belief that both varied between groups of archaic peoples and connected them in the eastern woodlands.

The Laurentian is a period of time in the Late Archaic ( to ) that describes the region from New England to Quebec, down into Pennsylvania and New Jersey. The Archaic peoples of this region and time period are one example of a group that produced polished bannerstones.

Bannerstones eventually went out of use as new technologies were invented and spread by trade routes. This includes the bow and arrow which appeared around or before 500 AD. While the bannerstones themselves went out of use, the ceremonial and spiritual importance of these objects did not, being transferred to the new objects that replaced them.

Notable finds

An important archaic site containing numerous graves containing bannerstones is at Indian Knoll, Kentucky. At this site, "few of the bannerstones show signs of use. They are carved of exotic imported stones with an exceptional artistry that exploits the natural colours, patterns, and striations of the stones to afford maximum visual satisfaction". This shows both the importance of long-distance trade in connecting various archaic societies as well as the importance they placed on the visual appeal of the pieces. This visual appeal would be created in part to please the spirits that the individuals were attempting to persuade for assistance and protection in the hunt, society, and the world as a whole.

Citations

References

Berlo, Janet C. and Ruth B. Phillips. Native North American Art. Oxford University Press: Oxford, England, 1998.
Fagan, Brian M. Ancient North America, Fourth Ed. Thames & Hudson: London, 2005.
Hero, Hawk, and Open Hand: American Indian Art of the Ancient Midwest and South. Richard R. Townsend and Robert V. Sharp, eds. Yale University Press: New Haven and London, 2004.

External links

The Metropolitan Museum of New York entry
The Archaic Bannerstone Project from the Fashion Institute of Technology

Archaeological artefact types
Indigenous sculpture of the Americas
Native American tools
Pre-Columbian art